In medicine, glycoprotein IIb/IIIa inhibitors, also GpIIb/IIIa inhibitors, is a class of antiplatelet agents.  

Several GpIIb/IIIa inhibitors exist:
 abciximab (abcixifiban) (ReoPro)
 eptifibatide (Integrilin)
 tirofiban (Aggrastat)
 roxifiban
 orbofiban

Use
Glycoprotein IIb/IIIa inhibitors are frequently used during percutaneous coronary intervention (angioplasty with or without intracoronary stent placement).  

They work by preventing platelet aggregation and thrombus formation.  They do so by inhibition of the GpIIb/IIIa receptor on the surface of the platelets.

They may also be used to treat acute coronary syndromes, without percutaneous coronary intervention, depending on TIMI risk.

They should be given intravenously. The oral form is associated with increased mortality and hence should not be given.

In integrin nomenclature glycoprotein IIb/IIIa is called αIIbβ3.

History
Their development arose from the understanding of Glanzmann's thrombasthenia, a condition in which the GpIIb/IIIa receptor is deficient or dysfunctional.

References